Polygrapta is a genus of moths of the family Erebidae. The genus was erected by George Hampson in 1926.

Species
Polygrapta albipuncta Gaede, 1939 Cameroon
Polygrapta angulilinea Gaede, 1939 Cameroon
Polygrapta argyropasta Hampson, 1926 Ghana

References

Calpinae